The World was a large nightclub in New York City, which operated from the early 1980's until 1991 at 254 East 2nd Street, in  Manhattan's East Village neighborhood. The venue, which included a secondary establishment called "The It Club," was housed in a former catering hall and theater. The World attracted a clientele that was economically, racially, and sexually diverse, and included artists, celebrities, and fashion designers, such as Keith Haring, Afrika Bambaataa, Madonna, Brooke Shields, Prince, Stephen Sprouse, RuPaul, and Carolina Herrera, together with banjee boys and members of voguing houses

An early incubator of New York's house music and club kid scenes, the World helped launch the careers of several prominent nightlife figures, including Michael Alig, DJ Larry Tee, DJ David Morales, DJ Frankie Knuckles, DJ Kip Lavinger, DJ Zoe B, the Lady Bunny, and Dean Johnson, whose Tuesday night "Rock and Roll Fag Bar" party gave rise to New York's gay rock and roll scene. Several big-name music acts also made cameo appearances at The World, including David Bowie, the Beastie Boys, The Ramones, Echo & the Bunnymen, Madness, Big Audio Dynamite, Sinéad O'Connor, Public Enemy, Neil Young, The Sugarcubes, Salt-N-Pepa, and Pink Floyd. The World was also used as one of the filming locations for Devo's 1988 music video for the song "Disco Dancer"

The World operated largely outside the law, and opened and closed unpredictably. It ceased operations permanently in 1991, when its owner was found dead on the premises. The building that housed The World was subsequently demolished and replaced with an apartment building.

References

External links 
 http://zoelund.com/docs/short/Lupino.html
 The World Facebook Page
 Video footage of the World featuring Michael Alig, Lady Bunny, James St. James, and other club kids and drag queens

Cultural history of New York City
Nightclubs in Manhattan
House music
1980s establishments in New York City
1991 disestablishments in New York (state)
1991 in New York City
1990s in Manhattan